Deferribacter desulfuricans is a species of sulfur-, nitrate- and arsenate-reducing thermophile first isolated from a deep-sea hydrothermal vent. It is an anaerobic, heterotrophic thermophile with type strain SSM1T (=JCM 11476T =DSM 14783T).

Genome structure

Deferribacter desulfuricans genome contains 2,23 Mbp with 2,184 protein coding genes.

References

Further reading

External links
LPSN
Type strain of Deferribacter desulfuricans at BacDive -  the Bacterial Diversity Metadatabase

Deferribacterota
Bacteria described in 2003